Westfield is a neighbourhood of Edinburgh, the capital of Scotland. It is north of the A71 road, between the Balgreen, Gorgie and Slateford areas.

Sources
(Google Maps)

Areas of Edinburgh